Karuah is a locality in both the Port Stephens and Mid-Coast Councils, the Port Stephens lga side is part the Hunter Region while the Mid-Coast lga is in the Mid North Coast region of New South Wales, Australia. It is thought that the name means 'native plum tree' in the local Aboriginal dialect.

History
In 1790, five convicts escaped from Sydney and relocated to the area. In 1795 the Karuah River was first surveyed as part of a wider survey of Port Stephens. In 1811 Governor Lachlan Macquarie decided to name the area the Clyde. By 1816 permits were issued to allow cedar cutting in the area. In 1824 the Australian Agricultural Company purchased a million acres to create the township. In 1907 the name was changed from Sawyers Point to Karuah.

Geography
Karuah is split between the Port Stephens and Mid-Coast councils with most (approximately 51%) located in the Port Stephens Council area. The village of Karuah is also split between the two councils with almost all of the village located in Port Stephens Council. The Karuah River, which runs approximately north to south through the centre of Karuah, forms the border between the two councils within the locality. Karuah is located at the north-western corner of Port Stephens into which the Karuah River feeds.

Demographics
 Aboriginal and Torres Strait Islander people made up 14.6% of the population. 
 80.1% of people were born in Australia and 89.8% of people spoke only English at home.
 The most common responses for religion were Anglican 26.7%, No Religion 25.0% and Catholic 19.9%.

The largest settlement within the locality is the village of Karuah, which is on the old Pacific Highway and straddles the Karuah River. It includes the largest Aboriginal community in the Port Stephens LGA and, at the 2006 Census, had a population of approximately 857. The rest of the suburb's population live in the rural properties which surround the village.

Transport
The Karuah bridge was built and opened in December 1957. In 2004, the Karuah Bypass was opened which, as part of the AusLink program, speeds up car and truck travel times past the township but left the town a backwater.

Oyster industry
Karuah village has long been known for its oysters, and a number of oyster shops line the old Pacific Highway within the town.

Notes

References

External links

 Karuah at Australian Explorer

Suburbs of Port Stephens Council
Towns in the Hunter Region
Suburbs of Mid-Coast Council